Edwin Throckmorton Thacher (29 April 1896 – 21 March 1966) (commonly known as Ebby Thacher or Ebby T.) was an old drinking friend and later the sponsor of Alcoholics Anonymous co-founder Bill Wilson. He is credited with introducing Wilson to the initial principles that AA would soon develop, such as "one alcoholic talking to another," and the Jungian thesis which was passed along to Rowland Hazard and, in turn, to Thacher that alcoholics could recover by a "genuine conversion".

Alcoholism
Thacher was a school friend of Wilson, and battled his whole life with alcoholism, frequently landing in mental hospitals or jail. After one bender, three members of The Oxford Group, Rowland Hazard, F. Shepard Cornell, and Cebra Graves, convinced the court to parole Thacher into their custody. Hazard taught Thacher the Oxford Group principles and the idea that a conversion was needed between patients. Hazard lodged him in the Calvary Rescue Mission, operated by the Calvary Episcopal Church in New York City.

Beginnings of AA
In November 1934, Thacher had arranged a visit to Wilson's apartment. Expecting to spend a day drinking and re-living old times, Wilson was instead shocked by Thacher's refusal to drink. "I've got religion," he reportedly said, to Wilson's surprise. Thacher told Wilson of his conversion at the Rescue Mission and acquainted Wilson with the teachings of Rowland Hazard about the Oxford Group life-changing program, as well as the prescription of Carl Jung for a conversion.

Wilson at first declined Thacher's invitation to sobriety, and continued to drink in a more restrained way for a short while. After talking with William D. Silkworth, however, he went to Calvary Rescue Mission and underwent a religious conversion; he was then admitted to the Charles B. Towns Hospital for Drug and Alcohol Addiction in New York City on December 11, 1934. Thacher visited him there on December 14 and essentially helped Wilson take what would become Steps Three, Four, Five, Six, Seven, and Eight.

Later life
Wilson stayed sober and eventually formed Alcoholics Anonymous with Bob Smith while Thacher soon returned to drinking. 

Thacher was the Assistant Director of High Watch Recovery Center in Kent, Connecticut in the summers of 1946 and 1947, during which time he remained sober. He returned to drinking after his tenure as Director.

Wilson always called Thacher his "sponsor," and even though he had returned to drinking, Wilson looked after his friend's welfare for the rest of his life. Thacher struggled on and off with sobriety over the years, and ultimately died sober in Ballston Spa, New York from emphysema in 1966. He is buried in his family plot at Albany Rural Cemetery in Albany, New York.

Cinematic portrayals
Thacher was portrayed by Gary Sinise in the TV movie My Name Is Bill W. (1989), which dramatized the founding of AA.

See also 
 Twelve-step program
 Twelve traditions
 Substance dependence

References

External links
 Edwin Throckmorton Thacher (Ebby)
 Ebby Thatcher's Eulogy By Bill W.
 Dick B., Real Twelve Step Fellowship History; The Conversion of Bill W.
 1958 Speech by Ebby Thacher in Memphis, TN

1896 births
1966 deaths
Alcoholics Anonymous
Deaths from emphysema